Harvest Christian Academy, Ghana, (HCA-Gh), is an American School in Accra, Ghana. The school is located in Baatsonaa-Accra along the Spintex Road, Ghana. HCA-Gh offers bus service to its campus from various sections of the city.

History
The original school, Harvest Time Christian Academy, was founded in 1999 in Houston, Texas under the ministry of Harvest Time Church. Key leaders of this church relocated to the West African Country of Ghana and opened a branch in Accra, along the Spintex Road corridor. This branch was opened in July 2013 to provide education for the local as well as the international community.

Curriculum
HCA-Gh provides a blend of Montessori and American Abeka curriculum for children from 3 months old [Creche'] to 5 years.

American international schools in Ghana
Schools in Accra
Educational institutions established in 2013
2013 establishments in Ghana